"Many Too Many" is a love song recorded by English rock band Genesis.

Background

It was released as a single from the album ...And Then There Were Three... in 1978 and written by the band's keyboardist, Tony Banks, who described it as "a simple love lyric". The single reached No. 43 on the UK Singles Chart, following the band's successful breakthrough into the Top Ten with "Follow You Follow Me". Its B-side had two non-album songs, "Vancouver" and "The Day the Light Went Out", both released on compact disc on the Genesis Archive 2: 1976–1992 box set. A music video was filmed for the song. Filming was done on-stage during the soundcheck prior to Genesis' appearance at the Knebworth Festival, on 24 June 1978. The audio was a replay of the studio version of the track, rather than being recorded live. The band have never performed the song live, though it was reported that, prior to the Coronavirus lock-down in 2020, the band had been rehearsing the song in preparation for the Last Domino? tour of the UK and Ireland at the end of 2020.

The song includes the last use of a Mellotron on any Genesis studio recording, though Tony Banks did use one sparingly on his 1979 solo album A Curious Feeling.

B Sides

Personnel
Phil Collins – vocals, drums
Tony Banks – piano, Mellotron, Roland RS-202
Mike Rutherford – electric guitar, bass guitar

Live
Although it was rehearsed for the …And Then There Were Three… Tour, the song was never performed by the band live. Tony Banks suggested it to be played on 2007's Turn It On Again: The Tour, but that did not happen. Despite their not performing the song, Genesis mimed it on a near empty field in Knebworth in June 1978 (2 days before their show there) for the Nationwide documentary "Three Dates with Genesis".

Chart performance

References

1978 singles
Genesis (band) songs
Songs written by Tony Banks (musician)
1978 songs
Charisma Records singles